Apisa canescens is a moth of the family Erebidae. It was described by Francis Walker in 1855. It is found in the Republic of the Congo, the Democratic Republic of the Congo, Eritrea, Ethiopia, Gabon, Kenya, Namibia, Rwanda, Saudi Arabia, Sierra Leone, Somalia, South Africa and Tanzania.

References 

Moths described in 1855
Syntomini
Erebid moths of Africa
Moths of the Middle East